Kaustinen sub-region  is a subdivision of Central Ostrobothnia and one of the Sub-regions of Finland since 2009.

Sub-regions of Finland
Geography of Central Ostrobothnia